Horteriset Dome is a broad ice-covered hill about  west of the southern part of the Weyprecht Mountains in Queen Maud Land, Antarctica. First photographed from the air by the Third German Antarctic Expedition (1938–39), it was mapped by Norwegian cartographers from surveys and air photos by the Sixth Norwegian Antarctic Expedition (1956–60) and named by them.

References

Ice caps of Antarctica
Bodies of ice of Queen Maud Land
Princess Astrid Coast